This is a list of members of the sixth legislature of the Supreme Soviet of the Estonian Soviet Socialist Republic which was the Estonian Soviet Socialist Republic's legislative chamber between 1940 and 1941, and between 1944 and 1992. The session ran from 17 March 1963 to 19 March 1967, and followed the 1963 Estonian Supreme Soviet election in which only Bloc of Communists and Non-Party Candidates was the only party able to contest the elections.

List of members 
Source: Jaan Toomla, Valitud ja Valitsenud: Eesti parlamentaarsete ja muude esinduskogude ning valitsuste isikkoosseis aastail 1917–1999 (National Library of Estonia, 1999), pp. 96–98.

References 

Lists of political office-holders in Estonia